She Couldn't Say No is a 1954 American rural comedy film starring Robert Mitchum, Jean Simmons and Arthur Hunnicutt. The last film in the long directing career of Lloyd Bacon, it was later re-released as Beautiful but Dangerous.

Plot
Wealthy Corby Lane (Jean Simmons) visits the American hamlet of Progress, Arkansas, whose residents had paid for a critical medical operation for her when she was a child. She decides to express her gratitude by giving them money anonymously. The headstrong woman clashes with the local doctor, Robert Sellers (Robert Mitchum), who foresees the resulting chaos.

Cast

 Robert Mitchum as Dr. Robert "Doc" Sellers
 Jean Simmons as Corby Lane, also known as Corby Johnson
 Arthur Hunnicutt as Otey Chalmers
 Edgar Buchanan as Ad Meeker
 Wallace Ford as Joe Whelan
 Raymond Walburn as Judge Holbert
 Jimmy Hunt as Digger

 Ralph Dumke as sheriff
 Hope Landin as Mrs. McMurty
 Gus Schilling as Ed Gruman
 Eleanor Todd as Sally Watson
 Pinky Tomlin as Elmer Wooley
 Dabbs Greer as Dick Jordan

Source:

Cast notes:
Robert Mitchum disliked the script for the film so much that at one point he went on suspension to avoid appearing in it.  It was not the last film he made for RKO, but it was his last RKO film to be released.

Production
Paramount Pictures originally purchased the property as a vehicle for William Holden, with Dick Powell scheduled to direct, but conflicts with Holden's schedule caused the studio to sell the rights to RKO. The working title for the film was changed from "A Likely Story" to "Beautiful but Dangerous" to avoid confusion with RKO's earlier film A Likely Story, released in 1946.  Other working or alternate titles included "Enough for Happiness", "Murder", and "She Had to Say Yes".  Principal photography took place between the middle of May and early June 1952.

References

External links
 
 
 
 

1954 films
1954 comedy-drama films
American comedy-drama films
1950s English-language films
Films scored by Roy Webb
American black-and-white films
Films directed by Lloyd Bacon
Films set in Arkansas
Films about health care
1950s American films